Halestorm is an American rock band from Red Lion, Pennsylvania, consisting of lead vocalist and guitarist Elizabeth "Lzzy" Hale, her drummer brother Arejay Hale, guitarist Joe Hottinger, and bassist Josh Smith.

The group's self-titled debut album was released on April 28, 2009, through Atlantic Records. Their second album The Strange Case Of... was released on April 10, 2012. Its lead single "Love Bites (So Do I)" won the Grammy Award for Best Hard Rock/Metal Performance on February 10, 2013. Their third album, Into the Wild Life (2015), peaked at number five on the Billboard 200. The band's fourth album, Vicious (2018), debuted at number eight on the chart, becoming their second top 10 record. Their most recent album, Back from the Dead, was released in May 2022.

Halestorm is well known for their near non-stop touring, often performing as many as 250 shows a year. Since 2006 they have toured with many hard rock and heavy metal acts including Alice Cooper, Alter Bridge, Chevelle, Seether, Staind, Papa Roach, Trapt, Three Days Grace, Theory of a Deadman, Buckcherry, In This Moment, Disturbed, Shinedown, Avenged Sevenfold, Stone Sour, Skillet, Hellyeah, Heaven & Hell, Evanescence, the Pretty Reckless, Starset, Sevendust, Dorothy, Lita Ford, Godsmack, Bullet for My Valentine, New Years Day, Stitched Up Heart, Lilith Czar and The Warning. Halestorm appeared on the first annual Rockstar Energy Drink Uproar Festival, and in October 2010 the band traveled to Japan to participate in the Loud Park Festival. Halestorm also appeared on the 2010 Taste of Chaos tour.

History

Formation and debut (1997–2011)

Siblings Arejay (born Terrance Averell Cooper Hale) and Elizabeth "Lzzy" Hale began actively writing and performing original music in 1997 when they were 10 and 13 years old. Lzzy started learning piano at the age of 5; she later progressed to a keytar, and Arejay the drums. She took guitar lessons at 16. The teen siblings released two EPs titled Forecast for the Future in 1997 and (Don't Mess With The) Time Man in 1999. In 2003, Joe Hottinger joined the band. In Halestorm's earlier days, Lzzy and Arejay's father, Roger Hale, played bass before Josh Smith joined the group in 2004.

The group signed a recording contract with Atlantic Records on June 28, 2005, and released a live EP titled One and Done on April 28, 2006. The EP, now out of print, featured an early live version of "It's Not You." Their self-titled debut album was released on April 28, 2009. The song "I Get Off" served as the album's lead single. Both the song and video for their second single, "It's Not You", were released in late November 2009. Singles and videos for "Love/Hate Heartbreak" and "Familiar Taste of Poison" were released in 2010.

On November 16, 2010 Halestorm released a live CD/DVD entitled Live in Philly 2010, which was recorded at The TLA in Philadelphia in early 2010. On March 22, 2011, Halestorm released an EP called ReAnimate containing covers of songs of different genres.

The Strange Case Of... (2012–2013)
On January 24, 2012, Halestorm released the EP Hello, It's Mz. Hyde. Their second full-length album, The Strange Case Of... was released on April 10, 2012, in the US, April 9 in the UK, and April 17 in Italy. On October 29, 2012 they were announced as the support for Bullet for My Valentine on their UK tour in March 2013.

On December 5, 2012 during a show at the Majestic Theater in Madison, Wisconsin, before Lzzy could start her piano ballad "Break In", guitarist Joe Hottinger ran up to her from off stage and told her that the song "Love Bites...(So Do I)" was nominated for a Grammy in the Best Hard Rock/Metal Performance Category. Drummer Arejay Hale asked on his mic what happened and after Lzzy replied to the audience that they had just been nominated for a Grammy, the crowd erupted in celebration. The entire event was recorded by a fan and posted on YouTube. On February 10, 2013 Halestorm won the award, becoming the first female-fronted band to both be nominated and win in that category. In April 2013, Halestorm reached the top of the Billboard Hot Mainstream Rock Tracks chart for the first time with their single "Freak Like Me". On August 6, 2013, the band premiered their video for "Here's to Us". On October 15, Halestorm released their second covers album entitled Reanimate 2.0.

Into the Wild Life (2014–2018)

Halestorm covered the Dio song "Straight Through the Heart" on the tribute album Ronnie James Dio – This Is Your Life, which was released on March 25, 2014. On March 28, 2014 Halestorm performed a brand new song called The Heartbreaker at the Cannery Ballroom in Nashville, Tennessee. In April, the band released a video on YouTube called A Day in the Life Of Halestorm 2014 (Backstage, Interview & New Song Mayhem). The title of the new album was originally set to be released January 13, 2015, but was actually moved a day earlier to January 12. The band has posted letters of the album name allowing for fans to try and unscramble them, and on January 12, 2015, their third full studio album entitled Into the Wild Life was announced with release dates for the UK and US, April 13 and 14 respectively.
In May 2015 will be released the photo book To Hale And Back in collaboration with photographer Rob Fenn, which documents the career of Halestorm so far. On January 6, 2017, Halestorm released their third covers album Reanimate 3.0. On May 17, 2017, they released the official music video for the song "Dear Daughter".

Vicious and Reimagined (2018–2020)
In February 2018, the band announced that work on their next album had begun. By May of the same year, Halestorm announced the release of their next album, Vicious on July 27, 2018. The band released the first single from the album, "Uncomfortable" that same day. It was followed by "Black Vultures" on June 22 and "Do Not Disturb" on July 19. The album came out on July 27.

In May 2019, "Chemicals" was released as a B-side single.  The song is an "homage to those we've lost and all of us struggling with mental illness".

After concerts were cancelled in 2020 due to the COVID-19 pandemic, Halestorm launched the #RoadieStrong campaign to raise financial support for live entertainment crews during the pandemic. Hale stated in an interview, "We feel for these guys and basically we ended up asking a bunch of our rock star friends and a bunch of our roadie friends to kind of help us create some awareness about this, and help give them all a direction of where to go." The effort was also supported by Avenged Sevenfold, Shinedown, and other artists.

On August 14, 2020, Halestorm released an EP called Reimagined. It features six songs, with five reworked Halestorm songs, including "Break In", featuring Amy Lee of Evanescence, and a cover of Dolly Parton's "I Will Always Love You".

Back from the Dead (2021–present) 
In January 2021, Hale announced that they had begun recording their next studio album, with a "socially distant" studio process. On August 17, 2021, the first song from the new album, "Back from the Dead", was released. The album Back from the Dead was released on May 6, 2022. A deluxe edition of the album with seven new songs was released in December 2022.

Appearances

Halestorm was the featured artist on the cover of Origivation magazine in October 2006 and appeared on the cover of Pennsylvania Musician magazine three times (August 1999, March 2000, and February 2003). Lzzy Hale appeared on the cover of Revolver magazine along with Grace Perry from Landmine Marathon in their December 2009 edition of the "Hottest Chicks in Metal." Lzzy Hale has also been noted for her use of Gibson Guitars. Arejay Hale was featured in the June 2010 issue of Modern Drummer magazine.

In mid 2012, Halestorm made a special requested appearance in an episode of Bar Rescue, titled "Owner Ousted", where they performed at the grand opening of the Fairfield, Ohio bar America Live (formerly Win, Place or Show).

On January 29, 2013 Halestorm performed on Jimmy Kimmel Live!. On February 22, Lzzy Hale sang the Guns N' Roses song "Out Ta Get Me" at Bandit Rock Awards in Stockholm Sweden, where Slash and his band were headlining. Hale's vocals are featured in a cover of "Close My Eyes Forever" and on the album of David Draiman's new project, Device.

During Dreamhack Winter 2019 performed on the main stage during the 25th anniversary of the event.

In a recent interview, Lzzy Hale revealed that she keeps the Grammy on her mantelpiece next to her other favorite trophy from the Schuylkill County Fair in Pennsylvania when Halestorm won third place in a talent contest in 1997.

Band members
Current members
 Lzzy Hale – lead vocals, rhythm guitar, acoustic guitar, keyboards, piano (1997–present), lead guitar (1997–1999), bass (1997–1998)
 Arejay Hale – drums, backing vocals (1997–present)
 Joe Hottinger – lead guitar, acoustic guitar, backing vocals (2003–present)
 Josh Smith – bass, keyboards, piano, backing vocals (2004–present)

Past members
 Leo Nessinger – lead guitar (1999–2000)
 Nate Myotte – lead guitar (2001-2003)
 Matt Grisco – lead guitar (2003)
 Roger Hale – bass (1998–2002)
 Scootch Frenchek – bass (2002)
 Phil Connolly – bass (2003)
 Dave Hartley – bass (2003-2004)

Timeline

Discography

Studio albums
 Halestorm (2009)
 The Strange Case Of... (2012)
 Into the Wild Life (2015)
 Vicious (2018)
 Back from the Dead (2022)

Awards and nominations

References

External links

 
 Halestorm at Atlantic Records
 2015 Lzzy Hale Interview on Guitar.com

1997 establishments in Pennsylvania
American alternative metal musical groups
Alternative rock groups from Pennsylvania
American post-grunge musical groups
Atlantic Records artists
Musical quartets
Grammy Award winners
Hard rock musical groups from Pennsylvania
Heavy metal musical groups from Pennsylvania
Musical groups established in 1997
Female-fronted musical groups